The SEAT 1430 is a 4-door sedan made by SEAT in Spain from 1969 to 1975. The car was based on the FIAT 124 Special, but the front lights were the square ones from the FIAT 125 instead of round. The cockpit was almost identical to the Fiat 125. In 1973, the GTI version of the SEAT 1430 was introduced as the 1430 Especial 1600 model, popularly known as "FU". It was superseded by the SEAT 131, while the donor car, the SEAT 124 continued in its base form until 1980. 

The SEAT 1430 also provided the engine and other underpinnings for the "Auto Replica MG 50", a Spanish-made replica of the MG TD.

References

1430
Cars of Spain

Cars introduced in 1969
1970s cars